In 1974, a newly converted Lockheed WC-130H (Air Force serial number 65-0965) was transferred to the 54th Weather Reconnaissance Squadron, the "Typhoon Chasers", at Andersen Air Force Base on Guam. The aircraft, using the call sign Swan 38, was sent to investigate Typhoon Bess after it passed over the Philippines and continued to the northwest. The crew departed Clark Air Base on the island of Luzon in the Philippines.

Radio contact with Swan 38 was lost after 22:00 on 12 October 1974, apparently as the aircraft was heading into the typhoon's eye to make a second position fix during its alpha pattern. There were no radio transmissions indicating an emergency on board, and search teams could not locate the aircraft or its crew except for a few pieces of debris. All six crew members were listed as missing and presumed dead. The Swan 38 crew members were: Capt. Edward R. Bushnell, 1st Lt. Gary W. Crass, 1st Lt. Michael P. O'Brien, 1st Lt. Timothy J. Hoffman, Tech. Sgt. Kenneth G. Suhr, and Sgt. Detlef W. Ringler.

References

Accidents and incidents involving United States Air Force aircraft
Missing aircraft
Accidents and incidents involving the Lockheed C-130 Hercules
Aviation accidents and incidents in 1974
1974 in the Philippines
1974 meteorology
October 1974 events in Asia
1974 disasters in Asia